Curious George Learns the Alphabet is a children's book written and illustrated by Margret Rey and H. A. Rey and published by Houghton Mifflin in 1963. It is the sixth book in the original Curious George series.

Plot

George curiously looks at the little black marks, dots, and lines in the Man with the Yellow Hat's books, and starts tearing some pages. When the Man returns, he pushes George around scolding him. If George wants to read a story, he first has to know the letters of the alphabet. The man then sets up a pad and begins to write each of the letters from the alphabet as well as drawing a picture for each letter (capital and lowercase letter) of the alphabet, correlating to the letter each individual picture starts with.

 An Alligator is in the form of a big A, and  a piece of an apple (an apple slice) is in the form of a small a.
 A blue Bird with feet on it, a tail, and a Bill is in the form of a big B, and a bee is in the form of a small b buzzing around a blossom.
 A big Crab is in the form of a big C with a shell, feet, and two Claws. A small crab is in the form of a small c, which looks like the big C, except smaller.

The man tells George he now has three letters: A, B, and C. With three letters, George can make a word, the first word he can read himself: cab. George knows what a cab is since the man once took him for a ride in a cab. The man and George then draw the next few letters.

 A Dinosaur is in the form of a big D and a dromedary, which is a camel (also known as the Arabian camel) with one hump, is in the form of a small d.
 An Elephant is in the form of a big E eating his evening meal: Eggplants. The ear of a man, or the ear of a monkey is in the form of a small e.
 A Fireman Fighting a Fire is in the form a big F and a flower is in the form of a small f. (George's friend was fond of flowers, even though George preferred food.)
 A Goose is in the form of a big G, and a goldfish is in the form of a small g. The name George also starts with the letter G.

After learning seven letters, the man writes the words that make up these letters down: Dad, Ed, bad, bag, cage, bed, and feed. The man then tells George to read them while he gets him his lunch. However, when the man comes back with George's lunch, he unpleasantly catches George wearing the alphabet chart around his neck. When he sees George's mischief, the man (despite impressed about the seven real words George had made) scolds George. The man says that even though George knows these words, the only word he also can read (in addition to the seven words) is "bad". The man then decides they've had enough for one morning. He will feed George now and let him take his nap, before they go on with the letters.

 A House is in the form of a big H and a horse eating heaps of hay is in the form of a small h.
 An Icicle is in the form of a big I, and an iguana is in the form of a small i.
 A Jaguar is in the form of a big J living in the Jungle, where George formerly lived. A jack-in-the-box is in the form of a small j in which George used to make it jump.
 A big Kangaroo named Katy is in the form of a big K and a small kangaroo, who is Katy's kid, is in the form of a small k.
 A Lion  is in the form of a small L (with a Leg of Lamb for Lunch) and a lean lady is in the form of a small l strolling along a lake licking a lollipop.
 A Mailman named Mr. Miller bringing a letter is in the form of a big M, and a mouse munching mints is in the form of a small m.

The man tells George that M is the 13th letter of the alphabet, which means that they are halfway through. The man gives George a pad of paper and a pencil to list some words that use the first 13 letters. George started to think of words, and then he wrote them down and shows them to the man. Though he is quite impressed with the real words (ball, milk, cake, ham, jam, egg, lime, feed, and kid), the man gets confused at the gibberish words (dalg, glidj, and blimlimlim). He scolds George for the gibberish words because are no such words and any letters put together do not make just any kind of words. George and the man then begin to look at the other half of the alphabet.

 A Napkin is in the form of a big N standing on a dinner plate that looks Neat, a nose is in the form of a small n in the face of a man who wears a new blue necktie and nibbles noodles.
 A big Ostrich is in the form of a big O, and a small ostrich is in the form of a small o. (Ostriches eat odd objects, especially tried a bugle that belonged to George--example, there's the ostrich in Curious George Rides a Bike.)
 A big Penguin is in the form of a big P, and a small penguin is in the form of a small p.
 A Quail is in the form of a small Q. A quarterback is in the form of a small q. A quarterback is supposed to be quick, so is George quick.

The man tells George to get his football. He then says that it will do George good to play for a short period of time before they go on with the letters.

 A Rabbit is in the form of a big R with a radish,  a rooster is in the form of a small r.
 A big Snail is in the form of a big S, and a small snail is in the form of a small s.
 A Table is in the form of a big T set for a Tea for Two (George did not care for Tea, but liked Toast), and a tomahawk is in the form of a small t.

The man tells George that it is snack time. He gives George a note to run over to the baker and hand him the note and to come right back with one dozen doughnuts without any tricks. George curiously looks at the note the man had written and tries to outsmart his plan by changing the word "one" to "ten." Then, he goes over to the bakery to request ten dozen doughnuts to the baker. The baker, unaware that the note originally and specifically said "one dozen", says that an extra-large bag is needed for ten dozen doughnuts. It may be a lot of doughnuts (except maybe for an extremely big doughnut party), but that is what the note said. George brings the bag of ten dozen (120) doughnuts home, opens the bag and dumps them out onto the floor. When the man unpleasantly catches George dumping all the doughnuts down to the floor and sees that the note has been changed, he sternly scolds him and says that it must be what he (himself) gets for teaching the alphabet to a little monkey. The man tells George he cannot eat any doughnuts right now and to put them back in the bag, so that they will finish the alphabet. As a result, snack time is postponed until the after the alphabet is finished.

 A big Umbrella standing Upright is in the form of a big U and a small umbrella is in the form of a small u. The umbrella handle also looks like the letter U.
 A big Valentine is in the form of a big V, and a small valentine is in the form of a small v. George loved valentines. He got several valentine cards every year, especially from Nevada.
 Whiskers, big ones and small ones, are in the form of a big W and small w, found on walruses, cats, and some men. George does not have whiskers but he was curious how would look if he did.
 The big X and the small x look alike, only one is big and one is small, just some of the other letters (such as W, V, U, S, etc.). Since there are only a few words that start with the letter X, neither of them look like the letter X, except for X-mas. Santa stands for Xmas. Since there is only one Santa, George and the man need only one picture. As a result, the big X and the small x are both for Xmas.
 A big Yak is in the form of a big Y, a small, young yak is in the form of a small y in Tibet.
 A big Zebra is in the form of a big Z, and a small zebra is in the form of a small z. The zebras are zipping along with zest.

Since Z is the last letter of the alphabet, the man tells George that he now knows all 26 letters of the alphabet, and now he may have the doughnuts. At the last page, the story ends when George (before eating some doughnuts) takes most of the doughnuts and spells out "THE END."

Error: Jaguars live in the jungles of Central and South America.  George, however, lived in the jungle of Africa.  

1963 children's books
American picture books
Alphabet books
Curious George
Houghton Mifflin books